Erion is an Albanian male given name, which means "Our wind". A related name is Erjon. The name may refer to:
Erion Hoxhallari (born 1995), Albanian footballer 
Erion Sula (born 1986), Albanian footballer 
Erion Veliaj (born 1979), Albanian politician
Erion Xhafa (born 1982), Albanian footballer

See also
Mepacrine, an antimalarial drug sometimes called Erion

References

Albanian masculine given names